Meri St. Mary is an American punk poet, singer, musician and artist.

Career
Meri St. Mary was part of the early punk music scene in Hollywood, California.   She was involved in many projects, including a Ramones video and the punk film Suburbia as well as television shows (new wave theater) and movies.  She also starred in Suicide Line, an underground punk film on 8 mm film, featuring  people from the punk scenes of San Francisco and Los Angeles.  During the same period she was in two  short-lived bands in Hollywood: "Toejam” with Maggie Ehrig, Christina Beck and Suava Smootha (playing KK Barrett's Radio, and introduced by Ice-T), and "Roadhog" with Nickey Beat, Smog Vomit, Rhys Williams (playing Cathay de Grande with Fear and The Minutemen. Known in early Hollywood as Meri (wagon) Housecoat, she was photographed by Bruce Kalhberg (and featured in NO magazine), as well as other photographers around the punk scene including Moshe Brakha, Gary Leonard, Eric Mueller, James Stark, Karl Hinz and Gywn Waters.  Early influences were live shows by the Screamers, the Weirdos, the Dickies and The Mau Maus, the latter of whom eventually  became friends, mentors and inspiration in art, music, visuals.

In the early 1980s, she moved to San Francisco and started the band Housecoat Project with  Eric Rad Yuncker, Michel Schorro and Erol Cengiz. The band opened for punk bands including Flipper, The Mutants, Skankin' Babylonians, Faith No More, Romeo Void,  Richard Hell, Weasel Contingent, A31, Poison Idea, MDC, Afflicted, Smashed Weekend, Three Day Stubble, Spot 1019, World Entertainment War, Frightwig, Bambi Lake, White Trash Debutantes, Seahag, Sister Double Happiness, Tragic Mulatto and Jah Big. until Yuncker died onstage at the Mabuhay Gardens, leaving St. Mary to begin again with a new lineup.  Housecoat Project released their first album Wide Eye Doo Dat on Subterranean Records.  They also  played the New Music Seminar in New York City, at the Pyramid Club in the lower east side; then toured the US. The band disbanded after their second recording in the late 1980s.

In the 1990s, St. Mary started a band called "Sex is A Witch" in San Francisco (Mia Simmans, Mark Pino, Rachel Thoele) another short-lived project that played shows like "Making Waves" on Market Street to The Visitation Valley Street Fair, the Valencia St. New College, "Bottom of the Hill" and a benefit for Kathy Peck's H.E.A.R. at 50 Oak Street. That venue had a Vibathon Floor for deaf participants to take in the music as well as the hearing. This show was the first webcast show in history.  In 2007 she resurfaced as an award-winning broadcaster at KVMR in Nevada City with her show The Underground Sound.  In 2009 she recorded with Lemon de George  and produced her first acoustic solo CD  “I’m Back”, distributed through Subterranean Records. She began performing again acoustically with a backup band or solo, collaborating with Michael Belfer, Craig Gray, Dominique Leslie, opening for Fancy Space People, Mr. Lucky, Th' Mole, Aaron Ross and others in Los Angeles, San Francisco and New York.

Meri St. Mary has been featured or interviewed in Punk Globe, RE/Search Pubs, KALX, KUSF, KXLU, KDVS, KPFA, Mutiny Radio and independent stage and television. In 2009 and 2010 she had her poetry published for the first time in the Chiron Review and the San Francisco poetry magazine OutofOur, as well as prose published in Primal Urge: A Journal for Diverse Humans in 2011.  Dave Boles of Cold River Press wrote Homage to A Word (For Meri St. Mary) in 2011 as well.  The 1989 Housecoat Project album Girlfriend has been remastered and released on vinyl through Subterranean Records with new artwork (October 2010). Housecoat Project's LPs on Subterranean Records are SUB 61 & SUB 66 catalog numbers.

In July 2009, the Housecoat Project (Meri St. Mary, Jay Crawford, Bob Bartosik, Mike Simms, Whitey Cox) performed a reunion show in San Francisco   and has continued to perform. In September 2012 Meri St. Mary's first book of poetry and art, YOU TORE US was released on Cold River Press.

Meri St. Mary also hosts a second award-winning (in 2011) radio show "Underground Sound", with podcasts, featuring notable figures of counterculture on KVMR radio.

In September 2012, her song "Time To Die" was used in an independent film Pig Death Machine by Apathy Productions, which screened at Artists' Television Access in San Francisco.

In November 2014, St. Mary's first electronic vinyl EP PROTAGONISTA! (with Th' Mole) was released on Beehive Records, and debuted in Berlin. In July 2015, a remastered CD version of PROTAGONISTA! was released independently, with shows in Sacramento and Hollywood.

In September 2015, the short film NINE DOORS debuted at The Nevada City Film Festival in California. St. Mary wrote, directed, and edited the film in collaboration with Camen Hodges for the song "Nine Doors" in PROTAGONISTA!

In October 2015, St. Mary collaborated with Monte Cazazza for the 20th NorCal Noisefest in Sacramento, playing dueling theremins.

References
The Underground Sound - Podcasts on KVMR 
Meri St. Mary KVMR-FM DJ 
Subterranean Records 
Meri St. Mary 2014 Berlin Tour The Union 
V.Vales Research Newsletter 
Foreword for YouToreUs written by V. Vale RE/Search Publications 
9 Spoken Word Poems recorded for My Audio Universe 
Robert Christgau of Village Voice reviews Housecoat Project 1st LP 
Silke Tudor of SF Weekly write up 
Rachel Leibrock of SN&R write up 
Dr. Andy's Poetry & Technology Hour Podcast on KDVS 
See Jane Do: Meri St. Mary w/Elisa Parker Podcast on KVMR 
Review of I'm Back East Bay Express 
"Wild Women Don't Die" Interview w/Ginger Coyote for Punk Globe, April 2012 
Insight w/Beth Ruyak - Capitol Public Radio - podcast 
Meri St. Mary & Th' Mole on The Big California Noise Compilation 
Blurt Magazine: Meri St. Mary – I'm Back review 
We Are All Pussy Riot/Radar Productions Blog - Michelle Tea - City Lights Reading 
Meri St. Mary and Monte Cazazza in Rokko's Adventures no 13 
"Catching Up with Meri St. Mary" interview in Punk Globe, August 2015 
Punk Globe Hot Gossip 
PROTAGONISTA! new Meri St Mary Berlin CD release Nov 2014 
Meri's SF '90s band Sex Is A Witch 
Housecoat Project on Discogs 
Meri St. Mary on Discogs 
Monte Cazazza at NCNF 2015 Duelling Theremins w/ Meri St. Mary (Excerpts) 
NINE DOORS video 
Meri plays a TR kid in Suburbia 

American punk rock musicians
Punk poets
People from Hollywood, Los Angeles
Living people
Year of birth missing (living people)
Women punk rock singers
Women in punk